Congo Norvell was a band led by Kid Congo Powers (Cramps, Gun Club, Nick Cave & the Bad Seeds, Kid Congo Powers & the Pink Monkey Birds) and Sally Norvell (Prohibition & the Norvells).  Congo Norvell formed in 1990 after Powers and Norvell met at the deathbed of a friend in Los Angeles. They embarked on a series of gigs meant to benefit friends dying of AIDS, and were noticed and signed to a record deal. They went on to record 3 studio albums (Music to Remember Him By, The Dope, the Lies, the Vaseline, & Abnormals Anonymous) and multiple EPs and compilations. After having been based in LA for a few years, they relocated to New York City in 1994 and played the NYC & East Coast circuit frequently.  They toured Europe and the North America, often opening for Nick Cave & the Bad Seeds.

Various incarnations of the band have included Jim Sclavunos (Nick Cave & the Bad Seeds & Grinderman), Paul Wallfisch (Little Annie, Botanica, & the Swans), Brian Emrich (Foetus), Kristian Hoffman (Mumps, Swinging Madisons), Mary Mullen, Joe Berardi, Keith Mitchell, Bill Bronson and Jack Martin.  Singer Mark Eitzel from American Music Club was featured in duets with Norvell on 1998's Abnormals Anonymous.

Discography
Lullabies  10" (Fiasco) 1993
Music to Remember Him By (Basura!/Priority) 1994
Live in the Mission 7" (Triple X Records)  1995
It Came From Beneath L.A. compilation (Triple X Records) 1995
The Dope, the Lies, the Vaseline (Basura!/Priority) 1996
Abnormals Anonymous (Jetset) 1998

External links
https://web.archive.org/web/20060506153424/http://www.kidcongopowers.com/disconorvell.html
Guitarist Kid Congo Powers discusses the life and times of Congo Norvell from NewYorkNightTrain.com

Musical groups from Los Angeles